Naval Colony (officially known as Haroon Bahria Co-operative Housing Society or H.B.C.H.S.) is a neighbourhood in the Karachi West district of Karachi, Pakistan, that previously was a part of Baldia Town until 2011. It is divided into four sectors, two sectors have 13 streets and two have 14 and each street has around 72 houses (although some streets of each sector have less than 72 houses). There are four main streets and two commercial streets. There are two Masajid, Masjid Quba and Masjid Nimra, however people have themselves established a few other masajid too.
A managing committee is being elected by public poll which surveils the administrative issues of the society.

Demography 
There are several ethnic groups including Punjabis, Baloch, Sindhis, Kashmiris, Seraikis, Pakhtuns, Brahuis, Hazarewals, Memons, Rajputs etc. Over 99% of the population is Muslim.

References

Neighbourhoods of Karachi
Baldia Town